Mostafa Nazari (born 11 December 1982) is an Iranian professional futsal coach and former player. Nazari was selected as the best futsal goalkeeper in the world in 2010.

Honours

Country
 AFC Futsal Championship
 Champions (3): 2007 - 2008 - 2010
 Asian Indoor Games
 Champion (2): 2005 - 2007
 Confederations Cup
 Champion (1): 2009
 WAFF Futsal Championship
 Champion (1): 2012

Club
 AFC Futsal Club Championship
 Champion (3): 2006 (Shensa) - 2010 (Foolad Mahan) - 2015 (Tasisat Daryaei)
 Iranian Futsal Super League
 Champion (4): 2005–06  (Shensa) - 2009–10 (Foolad Mahan) - 2014–15 (Tasisat Daryaei) - 2015–16 (Tasisat Daryaei)
 Runner-Up (4): 2008–09 (Eram Kish), 2010–11 (Giti Pasand) - 2011–12 (Giti Pasand) - 2017–18 (Tasisat Daryaei)

Individual
 Best player:
 Best futsal goalkeeper of the Iran in 2007-08.
 Best futsal goalkeeper of the world in 2010.
 Best futsal goalkeeper of the 2012 WAFF Futsal Championship
 Best futsal goalkeeper of the 2014–15 Iranian Futsal Super League

References

External links
 Official website
 
 
Mostafa Nazari on instagram

1982 births
Living people
People from Tehran
Sportspeople from Tehran
Iranian men's futsal players
Futsal goalkeepers
Shensa Saveh FSC players
Almas Shahr Qom FSC players
Foolad Mahan FSC players
Giti Pasand FSC players
Dabiri FSC players
Tasisat Daryaei FSC players
Sunich FSC players
Iranian expatriate futsal players
Iranian expatriate sportspeople in Russia
Iranian expatriate sportspeople in Indonesia
Iranian futsal coaches